Colobicus parilis is a species of cylindrical bark beetle in the family Zopheridae. It is found in Africa, Australia, North America, Oceania, and Southern Asia.

References

Further reading

External links

 

Zopheridae
Articles created by Qbugbot
Beetles described in 1860